Robert Carpenter (died 1607), was an English politician.

He was a Member (MP) of the Parliament of England for Rye in 1572, 1584, 1586, 1589 and 1593.

References

16th-century births
1607 deaths
Politicians from Carlisle, Cumbria
English MPs 1572–1583
English MPs 1584–1585
English MPs 1586–1587
English MPs 1589
English MPs 1593